Joseph M. Duff Jr. (January 28, 1889 – October 10, 1918) was an All-American football player and coach who was killed in action during World War I.  Duff graduated from Shady Side Academy in Pittsburgh, Pennsylvania before enrolling at Princeton University.  He played guard for Princeton and was selected for Walter Camp's All-American eleven in 1911.  After graduating from Princeton, Duff became an assistant football coach at the school for the 1912 football season, assisting head coach Logan Cunningham.  He served as the football coach at the University of Pittsburgh in 1913 and 1914 and graduated from the School of Law in 1915. He became a member of the Allegheny County Bar and went to work in the law firm of his brother James H. Duff.

In June 1917, he was in the Reserve Officers Training Camp in Fort Niagara, but was not given his commission due to a vision problem. Undeterred, he enlisted in the U.S. military in World War I and went to France as a private in the 313th Machine Gun Battalion, 80th Division.  He was promoted to the rank of a lieutenant on September 30, 1918 and transferred to the 32nd Division to lead a machine gun company for the 125th Infantry.  He was killed in action in Gesnes-en-Argonne, France on October 10, 1918.

Head coaching record

References

External links
 

1889 births
1918 deaths
American football guards
Princeton Tigers football coaches
Princeton Tigers football players
Pittsburgh Panthers football coaches
All-American college football players
American military personnel killed in World War I
United States Army officers
Shady Side Academy alumni
University of Pittsburgh School of Law alumni
People from Carnegie, Pennsylvania
Players of American football from Pennsylvania
Military personnel from Pennsylvania